Preston Joint School District 201 is the school district of Preston, Idaho.

Schools
 Preston High School
 Preston Junior High School
 Oakwood Elementary School
 Pioneer Elementary School
 Franklin County High School

References

External links
 

School districts in Idaho
Education in Franklin County, Idaho